Naked Violence a hardcore punk from Portland, Oregon, created by Frankie Violence and Mark Rhemrev in 1991. They brought back the rebellious feel and the aggressiveness lost by the grunge and alternative music movement. Inspired by the lyrics of such bands as The Dwarves and Black Flag. Playing songs that were easily offensive in Portland and received a lot of bad press that never mentioned the music. Jumping on tours with such bands as The Mentors, Nashville Pussy, Gas Huffer, Dayglo Abortions, D.R.I. and G.G. Allin in his last appearance in the northwest. As Jeff "Filthy" Thomas joined to be the first second guitarist, Mark Rhemrev left the band to join The Weaklings. The band parted ways in 2004.

Frankie Violence was often recognized by his roaring bass sound.  His nephew is American electronic musician JLectric (real name Josh Burley).

Mark Rhemrev's Aunt Marianne Marks played "Chesty Young Thing" in Russ Meyer's Up! as well as appearances in CHiPs, The Love Boat, and The A-Team

Drummer Steve Andrews was in The submissives with Pig Champion from Poison Idea and Dave Dictor from MDC.

Band members
 Frankie Violence (Bass)(1991–1995)(Vocals, Bass)(1995–2004)
 Dave Wallan (Vocals)(1991–1995)
 Mark Rhemrev (Guitar)(1991–1999)
 Mike Reese (Drums)(1991–1993)(1997–1999)
 Jeff "Filthy" Thomas (Guitar/Backing Vocals)(1998–2004)
 Sean "Troll" Katterle (Drums)(1993–1996)
 Steve Andrews (Drums)(2000–2004)

Discography
 Naked Violence (1991)
 Sauced         (1992)
 Royal Flush    (1993)
 Our Disgusting Pastimes (1993)
 Naked Violence/Dickfinger (1994)
 Naked Violence (1996)
 She's Got It   (1998)
 13 Ways        (2001)

Hardcore punk groups from Oregon
Musical groups from Portland, Oregon
1991 establishments in Oregon
2004 disestablishments in Oregon
Musical groups established in 1991
Musical groups disestablished in 2004